Donji Korićani is populated place in Bosnia and Herzegovina, Republika Srpska, Kneževo Municipality. The village is located on a hill (about 1150 m) between Pougarje and Ilomska's branch of Korićanske stijene.

On census year 2013, in the Donji Korićani were a total of 105 inhabitants.

History
The settlement Donji Korićani to the War in Bosnia and Herzegovina (1992-1995) in general was located in the Travnik Municipality.

Population

See also
Korićani
Korićanske stijene
Vlašić (Bosnian mountain)
Pougarje (valley)

References

External links
 Official website of Kneževo municipality

Villages in Bosnia and Herzegovina
Villages in Republika Srpska
Kneževo, Bosnia and Herzegovina